Yurka may refer to:

 Yurka, Iran, a village
 8781 Yurka, an asteroid
 Blanche Yurka, an American actress